The 1899–1900 Welsh Amateur Cup was the tenth season of the Welsh Amateur Cup. The cup was won by Wellington St. Georges United who defeated Llanrwst Town 2-0 in the final, at Flint.

First round

Second round

Third round

Fourth round

Semi-final

Final

References

1899-00
Welsh Cup
1899–1900 domestic association football cups